Wak or WAK may refer to:

 Vehicle number plate code for Wartburgkreis, Germany
 WAK (Kevin A Williams) (born 1965), Chicago artist
 Wak Chanil Ajaw, Maya princess circa 682 AD

See also 
 El Wak (disambiguation)
 Waks (disambiguation)
 Waq (disambiguation)
 Wack (disambiguation)
 WAC (disambiguation)
 Wakwak, a mythical creature
 Wāḳwāḳ, a legendary island